Thomas Rowe (1829–1899) was a British-born architect, builder and goldminer in Australia.

Thomas Rowe or Tom Rowe may also refer to:

Thomas Rowe (mayor), Lord Mayor of London
Thomas Rowe (tutor) (1657–1705), English nonconformist minister
Thomas Rowe (Don CeSar), founder of the Don CeSar Hotel in St. Petersburg Beach, Florida
Tom Rowe (ice hockey) (born 1956), American ice hockey player and coach
Tom Rowe (footballer) (1920–2003), Australian rules footballer for Hawthorn
Tom Rowe (musician) (1950–2004), bass player
Tom Rowe (cricketer) (born 1993), plays for Nottinghamshire
Tommy Rowe (born 1988), English football player for Stockport, Peterborough and Wolves
Tommy Rowe (footballer, born 1913) (1913–2006), English football player for Portsmouth
Tom Rowe (rugby union) (born 1991), New Zealand rugby union player

See also

Thomas Roe (disambiguation)